Ruthann DeBona (born March 7, 1976), also known by her ring name of Rue DeBona,  is a former host, backstage interviewer, singer and actress, who worked for World Wrestling Entertainment (WWE).

Background
Debona was a member of a pop group named Boy Krazy under the stage name Ruth Ann Roberts, which had a hit single with "That's What Love Can Do" in 1993.

Debona has had guest appearances in shows Law & Order, The Sopranos, Spin City and others, including a role on the Mickey Mouse Club in 1993.

She also has a role in the movie They're Just My Friends.

Professional wrestling career
In 2003, WWE signed DeBona to be the host of their show Afterburn. On an episode of SmackDown she interviewed Sable and Torrie Wilson on their Playboy covers. In late June 2004, DeBona asked for her release from the company which she was subsequently granted.

Personal life
DeBona was married to former WWE and current Impact Wrestling commentator Josh Mathews from November 2006 until their divorce in 2008.

References

External links

Rue DeBona's Official Website

1976 births
American people of Italian descent
Living people
Professional wrestling announcers